The Concert in the Park was a benefit concert held in Ellis Park Stadium, Johannesburg, South Africa, on 12 January 1985. 22 bands played at the benefit, which was attended by an estimated 125,000 people—of whom about 100,000 had purchased tickets. Proceeds of more than R450,000 went to Operation Hunger, a South African charity founded in 1978.

The bands and solo artists who played that day were:

The band Bright Blue knew they would not be available to play live, but lead singer and songwriter Rob Levitan wrote a song for the occasion, which was recorded and mixed at the Workshop and Ovation Studios in Johannesburg. The song, "Hungry Child", was performed by vocalists Heather Mac (of Ella Mental), Johnny Clegg, Ronnie Joyce, and Steve Kekana, backed by session musicians.

A live album made at the concert was released later that year, as was a single featuring "Hungry Child".

Live album
The live double album Concert in the Park was released on LP record and compact cassette in 1985, distributed by WEA Records. The LP release was packaged in a gatefold cover.

Track listing

References

External links
 
 

1985 in music
Benefit concerts
Events in Johannesburg
South African music